Raffaele Schiavi (born 15 March 1986) is an Italian footballer who plays as a centre back for Maltese club Sliema Wanderers.

Biography
Schiavi's first club was Salernitana, but he only played eight times before joining Lecce in 2005. He had to wait for a chance in the first team however, and had a loan spell at Brescia where he made four appearances. He joined the Serie B team Vicenza Calcio in 2010, in a loan with option to purchase deal. He was a first team regular for Vicenza in the 2010–11 campaign, making 38 appearances with 3 goals.

In June 2011 Vicenza  signed him outright, for €750,000. Co-currently Lecce signed the remain 50% registration of Davide Brivio for €750,000.

On 16 July 2011, Schiavi joined the Serie A side Parma F.C. in 5-year contract, also for €750,000 (€600,000 cash plus Marco Pisano). He was loaned to Calcio Padova on the same day.

On 10 July 2014 Schiavi was signed by Serie B club Frosinone in 2-year contract for free. On 19 January 2015 he was sold to Calcio Catania for €200,000.

On 6 August 2015 he was signed by Salernitana in a 3-year contract.

On 2 August 2019, he signed a 2-year contract with Cosenza.

On 12 August 2021, he joined Paganese on a one-year deal. On 29 December 2021, his contract was terminated by mutual consent.

On 18 January 2022, he moved to Sliema Wanderers in Malta.

Personal life
His cousin Pio Schiavi is also a footballer.

On 26 August 2020 he tested positive for COVID-19.

References

External links

1986 births
Living people
People from Cava de' Tirreni
Sportspeople from the Province of Salerno
Italian footballers
Association football defenders
U.S. Salernitana 1919 players
U.S. Lecce players
Brescia Calcio players
L.R. Vicenza players
Parma Calcio 1913 players
Calcio Padova players
Spezia Calcio players
Delfino Pescara 1936 players
Frosinone Calcio players
Catania S.S.D. players
Cosenza Calcio players
Paganese Calcio 1926 players
Sliema Wanderers F.C. players
Serie B players
Serie A players
Serie C players
Italian expatriate footballers
Expatriate footballers in Malta
Italian expatriate sportspeople in Malta
Footballers from Campania